Highway 228 (AR 228, Ark. 228, and Hwy. 228) is a designation for two state highways in Northeast Arkansas. One route of  begins at County Road 534 (CR 534) at Clover Bend and runs east to Highway 367 in Minturn. A second route of  begins at Highway 91 and runs northeast to US Highway 412 (US 412) at Light. Both routes are maintained by the Arkansas Department of Transportation (ArDOT).

Route description

Minturn
Highway 228 begins state maintenance at Lawrence County Road 534. It runs east through the Clover Bend Historic District to Minturn, where it ends at US 67.

Highway 91 to Light
Highway 228 runs diagonally from southwest to northeast, beginning at Highway 91. The route runs northeast, serving as the northern terminus of Highway 349 before entering Sedgwick where it meets US 63. Highway 228 overlaps US 63 briefly before turning northeast into Greene County. It continues northeast to terminate at US 412 at Light.

History
Highway 228 was created by the Arkansas State Highway Commission on July 10, 1957, between Clover Bend and Minturn. A second route was created between Sedgwick and Light April 24, 1963. Highway 228 was extended west to Highway 91 on May 23, 1973.

Major intersections
Mile markers reset at concurrencies.

See also

 List of state highways in Arkansas

References

External links

228
Transportation in Lawrence County, Arkansas
Transportation in Greene County, Arkansas